Preakness is an unincorporated community located within Wayne in Passaic County, New Jersey, United States.

The colt Preakness, for whom the Preakness Stakes Thoroughbred horse race at Pimlico Race Course in Baltimore, Maryland is named, was owned by Milton H. Sanford's Preakness Stables located at the corner of Valley Road and Preakness Avenue.

Preakness is the birthplace of Canadian Horse Racing Hall of Fame trainer, Barry Littlefield and his brother Fred Littlefield, a jockey who won the 1888 Preakness Stakes.

The name itself was said to have come from the Native American Minisi name Pra-qua-les for "Quail Woods" in the area.  An alternative translation derives the name from per-ukunees, which is thought to mean "young buck".

Demographics

References

Wayne, New Jersey
Unincorporated communities in Passaic County, New Jersey
Unincorporated communities in New Jersey